Weymul (also referred to as Chirrata) is a small Aboriginal community, located 30 km south of Karratha in the Pilbara region of Western Australia, within the City of Karratha.

Native title 
The community is located within the fully determined Ngarluma / Yindjibarndi (WAD6017/96) native title claim area.

Governance 
The community is managed through its incorporated body, Weymul Aboriginal Corporation, incorporated under the Aboriginal Councils and Associations Act 1976.

Town planning 
Weymul Layout Plan No.2 has been prepared in accordance with State Planning Policy 3.2 Aboriginal Settlements. Layout Plan No.2 was endorsed by the community on 10 April 2007 and the Western Australian Planning Commission on 1 July 2008. The Layout Plan map-set and background report can be viewed at Planning Western Australia's website.

References

External links
 Office of the Registrar of Indigenous Corporations
 Native Title Claimant application summary

Towns in Western Australia
Aboriginal communities in Pilbara